Harry K. Harring (1871–1928) was a zoologist specializing in the study of Rotatoria. He was born in Nykjobing, Denmark and emigrated to the United States in 1893. He wrote The Rotifers of Wisconsin with Frank Jacob Myers. He was awarded the honorary title of Custodian of the Rotatoria in the Division of Marine Invertebrates of the United States National Museum (USNM) in 1914.

References 
 Harry K. Harring papers from the Smithsonian Institution Archives

External links
 

1871 births
1928 deaths
American zoologists
Smithsonian Institution people